Shacklewell Lane Mosque is a Turkish mosque located in Shacklewell, London. Established by Ramadan Güney, his wife Suheyla Güney and other Trustees Turkish Cypriot in 1977, it is the first ever Turkish mosque in the United Kingdom. The mosque is an Andalusian-style building and was previously a synagogue, known as the New Dalston Synagogue.

See also 

Aziziye Mosque (London)
Suleymaniye Mosque (London)
Islam in London
Islam in the United Kingdom
Turks in the United Kingdom

Notes

References

 
 
 .
 

Mosques in London
Mosques completed in 1977